The 1971 British Grand Prix was a Formula One motor race held at Silverstone on 17 July 1971. It was race 6 of 11 in both the 1971 World Championship of Drivers and the 1971 International Cup for Formula One Manufacturers. The 68-lap race was won by Tyrrell driver Jackie Stewart after he started from second position. Ronnie Peterson finished second for the March team and Lotus driver Emerson Fittipaldi came in third.

Race report  

On one of the fastest circuits on the calendar, horsepower counted for everything. Clay Regazzoni, driving for Ferrari, gained pole with a scorching lap of 1 min 18.1 secs, beating Jackie Stewart in a Tyrrell and Jo Siffert in a BRM by just a couple of hundredths of a second. BRM were mourning the loss of Pedro Rodríguez in a sports car race a few days earlier.

The start itself was a shambles, with a bungled flag drop causing a collision between Jackie Oliver and Graham Hill, for which Oliver was fined £50. Regazzoni led away from Jacky Ickx and Stewart, but after just one lap Stewart had passed Ickx, with Siffert following him. On lap 4, Stewart passed Regazzoni and disappeared into the distance. By lap 10 he was over 3 seconds ahead. In the points positions, Emerson Fittipaldi, Ronnie Peterson and Tim Schenken were having a memorable tussle. Regazzoni repassed Siffert who was suffering from vibration problems on lap 15, but the BRM driver managed to hang on to the back of the Ferrari for several more laps. Stewart increased his lead to 14 seconds and by lap 20 he was ahead by 18 seconds. Ickx dropped out of fourth place with rubber breaking off from his front left tyre, and Siffert dropped way down with a broken coil bracket. The battle between Peterson, Schenken and Fittipaldi moved up into 3rd, 4th and 5th places.

On lap 48, tyre problems struck Regazzoni and further problems ensued when he tried to leave the pits after his tyre change to find his engine had no oil pressure. Schenken too dropped down the field with gearbox problems and retired completely when it jammed for good 4 laps from home.

Henri Pescarolo and Rolf Stommelen thus moved up into the battle for 4th and 5th, duelling right to the line, with Pescarolo winning out by just 0.5 seconds. John Surtees gained 6th place.

Stewart took a commanding home win and extended his lead in the Championship to 23 points.

Classification

Qualifying

Race

Championship standings after the race

Drivers' Championship standings

Constructors' Championship standings

Note: Only the top five positions are included for both sets of standings.

References

British Grand Prix
British Grand Prix
Grand Prix